Taraxacum suecicum is a species of plants belonging to the family Asteraceae.

It is native to Northern Europe and Baltic states.

References

suecicum